Christopher George de Villiers Burger (12 July 1935 – 5 June 2014) was a South African cricketer who played in two Tests in 1958.

Chris Burger went to school at Michaelhouse, and represented Natal Schools at rugby union and South African Schools at cricket in 1953 and 1954. He was an attacking  middle-order batsman who played first-class cricket for Natal from 1956 to 1966. After making useful runs for Natal in their two matches against the touring Australians in 1957–58 he was selected in South Africa's team for the Fourth and Fifth Tests. He top-scored with 37 not out in the second innings of the Fifth Test, but it was only enough to avert an innings defeat, and Australia went on to win by eight wickets.

Burger toured England in 1961 with the South African Fezela XI of promising young players. His most successful season was 1962–63, when he made 540 runs at an average of 45.00. He also made his highest score that season, 131 in 149 minutes against Eastern Province, when Natal scored 468 for 6 on New Year's Eve and went on to win by an innings and 234 runs.

References

External links
 Chris Burger at Cricinfo
 Chris Burger at CricketArchive

1935 births
2014 deaths
Alumni of Michaelhouse
South Africa Test cricketers
South African cricketers
KwaZulu-Natal cricketers
Free Foresters cricketers
People from Randfontein
Sportspeople from Gauteng